Elegy of the North  Northern Elegy or Dirge is a 1957 Japanese drama film directed by Heinosuke Gosho. It is based on the novel Banka by Yasuko Harada.

Plot
Reiko, a young, disabled woman (she suffers from a limp left arm after a joint inflammation in her childhood), and member of an amateur theatre troupe, starts a passionate affair with the much older and married architect Katsuragi. Katsuragi's wife in turn has an affair with medical student Tatsumi, who is obsessed with her and refuses to break off the relationship. Fascinated by Mrs. Katsuragi, Reiko manages to make personal contact with her. The women get acquainted with each other, but Reiko develops a deeper affection for Mrs. Katsuragi which might be the love for a substitute mother (Reiko's natural mother has died), or even beyond. Reiko, always feeling incomplete due to her disability and torn between her feelings for Katsuragi and his wife, accuses him of not loving but only pitying her. When she finally tells Mrs. Katsuragi of the affair with her husband, the older woman refuses to scold her despite her pleas. After Mrs. Katsuragi commits suicide, Reiko leaves her lover and joins the theatre troupe which is on the way to another stage show.

Cast
 Yoshiko Kuga as Reiko Hyodo
 Masayuki Mori as Setsuo Katsuragi
 Mieko Takamine as Akiko Katsuragi
 Fumio Watanabe as Tatsumi Furuse
 Akira Ishihama as Mikio Fusada
 Tatsuo Saitō as Reiko's father
 Kumeko Urabe as Reiko's grandmother
 Chikako Kaga as Setsuo's niece

References

External links
 
 
 

1957 films
1957 drama films
Japanese drama films
Films based on Japanese novels
Films directed by Heinosuke Gosho
Films scored by Yasushi Akutagawa
1950s Japanese films